Guido and Maurizio De Angelis, also known as Oliver Onions, are a prolific duo of Italian musicians, multi-instrumentalists, composers and singers, as well as television and film producers. They reached the height of their popularity in the 1970s and early 1980s both as composers (under their own names) and as performers (as Oliver Onions), mainly thanks to their scoring and theme song composing and performing for action/comedy films starring the popular duo of Bud Spencer and Terence Hill, many of which became huge hits all across Europe, both cinematically and musically. After a period of retirement from the music business in the 1990s and early 2000s, during which they moved into television and film production through their own company (named after themselves), they had a musical comeback thanks to a one-off concert event in Budapest, Hungary, billed as Oliver Onions Reunion Live Budapest and organized by local promoter Gábor Köves mainly because of the duo's popularity in his homeland, itself due to the fact that Spencer & Hill films were hugely popular in the country during the Communist regime - and, according to Maurizio De Angelis's commentary on the show, still are. The event, testified by the 2017 release of a double CD/DVD box set, led to a series of other successful shows in Italy and Europe in the following years.

Beginnings
The brothers were born in Rocca di Papa, near Rome; Guido on 22 December 1944 and Maurizio on 22 February 1947. Their musical career started in 1963, when, after successfully releasing an LP, they became arrangers for RCA Italiana. Their success led to many more albums in which they composed and arranged the music and sang all the vocals.

Oliver Onions
The De Angelis brothers were among the most prolific Italian musicians of the 1970s. In fact, they were forced to use different names for many of their projects to avoid over-saturating the market; during their career, they were variously known as G&M Orchestra, Barqueros, Charango, Kathy and Gulliver, Hombres del Mar and Dilly Dilly. However, the name they came to be mostly identified with, and most popular, was suggested by their frequent collaborator and lyricist Susan Duncan-Smith, a British-born journalist who worked in RCA's foreign relationships department. She advised them that, although they did not run any risks in signing their early Spaghetti Western film score work under their own names (following in the footsteps of the popularity gained by fellow Italian Ennio Morricone in the same genre), their international credibility as singers of theme songs in English would be undermined if they did not perform under an English-language name. The brothers followed Duncan-Smith's advice and named themselves Oliver Onions after the homonymous British writer; the name was chosen mostly because it was easy to remember for both people who speak English and people who do not, and because the two words are pronounced the same as they are written.  In Italy, they became best known for writing and performing the theme song for Sergio Sollima's 1976 TV series Sandokan, based on novels by Emilio Salgari, which they also wrote the music score for; the song, heard under the opening credits, became a no.1 hit in the Italian pop charts in the same year. Their soundtrack for the 1981 cartoon series Viva i Re Magi (previously released in 1979, in Spanish language, in Mexico and Argentina as Vivan los Reyes Magos), for which they wrote the story and the screenplay as well as the full score and all the songs (which they sang themselves) was also a local hit.

Their recording "Santa Maria" was German number one single for six weeks in 1980 in its original Italian recording. It was followed by a German language version by Roland Kaiser, which was number one for another five weeks, see List of number-one hits of 1980 (Germany). The Roland Kaiser version was also number one in the Netherlands and Belgium.

Film scores
Although they released many standalone albums, it is for their soundtrack work for which the De Angelis brothers are best known. Out of their many scores, which include the main theme for the 1983 Italian cult movie Yor, the Hunter from the Future, undoubtedly the most famous and popular are those composed for the Bud Spencer & Terence Hill action/adventure/comedy films, starting with Hill's "Trinity" Spaghetti Western trilogy. Most of their theme songs for the comedy duo's films were hits in every country where the films were released, became equally popular as the films themselves and almost synonymous with them. Their song "Dune Buggy", for the 1974 film Watch Out, We're Mad, topped the European charts.

Their scores included many cult Italian films such as Trinity Is Still My Name, Torso, High Crime, The Violent Professionals, Chino, Street Law, Violent Rome, The Big Racket, Mannaja, The Mountain of the Cannibal God, Killer Fish, and A Blade in the Dark. In 1978, they did an alternate version of the title song for The Return of the Saint TV show starring Ian Ogilvy. Their song "Taking It Easy" was used in the European versions of the show, where another version was used in English-speaking countries.

They are also known for their work on animated series, having composed original songs for Italian-dubbed anime (such as Doraemon, Ashita no Joe and Galaxy Express 999) and European series (such as Around the World with Willy Fog). They also composed the music for the cartoon series Dogtanian and the Three Muskehounds and Bobobobs.

Later years: Withdrawal from music and comeback

By the early 1990s the brothers had become disillusioned with the music business in general and in particular by their almost systematic lack of recognition as professional composers in Italy (although they were maintaining a solid fan base outside of their homeland). As a result of this, they decided to slowly withdraw from music composition and performance in order to move into the more behind-the-scenes, but also more profitable business of production for television series and films. During this period, the duo kept their musical output to the bare minimum, often limiting themselves to scores and soundtracks for their own television and cinematic productions, some of which were mainly composed and arranged by Maurizio (the duo's most musically active member) on his own, with his older brother Guido only providing basic melodic ideas; they still managed to score sizeable audience hits in the area of production, with long running drama/romantic series such as Elisa di Rivombrosa and Incantesimo (among several others), broadcast for several seasons respectively by Mediaset and RAI.

The first hint of their long-awaited return to music came in November 2007, when they performed their first concert as Oliver Onions in 25 years, at the Lucca Comics Festival. Nine years later, in July 2016, Hungarian music promoter and impresario Gábor Köves asked them to put on an Oliver Onions "reunion" and perform their greatest hits live on stage, backed by a rock band and a full orchestra, in a one-off concert event meant both as a celebration of their career and a tribute to their then-recently departed friend Bud Spencer. According to Maurizio De Angelis's account of the episode in the liner notes for the 2017 audio/video release of the event, Kóves persuaded them to perform in Budapest by demonstrating to them how popular they still were in Hungary, showing them a large number of fan pages, both on Facebook and on the Internet in general, created by local fans as a tribute to them and to Spencer & Hill films. Maurizio also admitted that he and Guido were initially very reluctant to perform live, as they had not done so for many years and felt rusty and unprepared; in particular, Guido was utterly terrified at the prospect of singing lead vocals live, as he had been almost completely uninvolved in music for a very long time - having engaged himself only in film production. Still, the brothers decided to apply an old Italian proverb (known locally as the "Bicycle Rule"), which states that "Once you have learned how to ride a bicycle, you never forget". By applying that rule, they came back on their musical feet within one week of intensive studio rehearsals and, once they were actually reunited as musicians, the adrenaline rush was such that Guido managed to overcome his fears and apply the "Bicycle Rule" to himself as well. The event was hugely successful, both locally and elsewhere. Subsequently, it spawned a series of short but intense tours of Italy and Europe in the following years, all billed as Oliver Onions Is Still Our Name (parodying the title of their 1971 soundtrack for the second Terence Hill "Trinity" film). Their latest such tour ended on 30 October 2019 at Lucca Comics and Games and resumed in late summer of 2020, after a forced interruption due to the outbreak of the COVID-19 pandemic.

In October 2021, the duo released Future Memorabilia, a greatest hits album including re-recorded versions of their best-known film and TV theme songs, some of them performed as duets with popular Italian and international stars - namely, former Thegiornalisti frontman Tommaso Paradiso, Roland Kaiser, Claudio Baglioni, Elio from Elio e le Storie Tese (adding his peculiar voice to the duo's popular "Firefighters Choir" from Watch Out, We're Mad!, a staple of their live repertoire) and Elhaida Dani. The song "Banana Joe", from the same-titled 1982 film, includes vocal snippets performed by Bud Spencer, who sang it in the original film. The duo then started a tour of Italy to promote the album. 

Their theme for Zorro (1975), "Zorro Is Back", was featured in Wes Anderson's Bottle Rocket, and their song "Goodbye My Friend" (from the movie Street Law) featured on the soundtrack to Faster.

Selected filmography

Oliver Onions personnel

1971–1990
 Guido De Angelis - Lead and backing vocals, guitars, percussion
 Maurizio De Angelis - Lead and backing vocals, guitars, piano, keyboards, synths
 Cesare De Natale - Backing vocals, lyricist, co-composer
 Susan Duncan-Smith - English-language lyricist, backing vocals

2007–present
Guido De Angelis - Vocals
Maurizio De Angelis - Vocals, guitars, mandolin, piano, keyboards
Emanuele Giordani - Drum kit
Riccardo Di Vinci - Bass guitar
Danny Bronzini - Guitars
Filippo Piva - Guitars, vocals
Francesco Signorini - Keyboards
Marco Zago - Keyboards
Fabio Baù - Trumpet, French horn
Giovanni Forestan - Saxophone, flute, clarinet
Alberto "Zach" Gigante - Additional vocals
"Ray" Alberto Secondino - Additional vocals
Oliver Onions' 2016 comeback show in Budapest also featured a string quartet and six female backing vocalists, as well as Hungarian orchestra Magyar Studió Zenekar and session choir Cinema Studió Kórus.

Discography

As Oliver Onions

Albums 

 See You Later (1974)
 Greatest Hits (1977) – GER #32
 Bulldozer (1979)
 Six Ways (1979)
 Santa Maria (1980) – GER #42, AUT #12
 Brigitte Aerobic (1983; Germany)
 Best of Bud Spencer & Terence Hill (1992; Germany) – GER #51
Future Memorabilia (2021)

Singles

References

External links
 
 
 

Italian film score composers
Italian male film score composers
Musicians from Rome
Living people
Nastro d'Argento winners
Sibling duos
Italian musical duos
RCA Records artists
Sony Music artists
Year of birth missing (living people)